Alan Robinson may refer to:

 Alan Robinson (Canadian politician)
 Alan Robinson (Northern Irish politician)
 Alan Robinson (rugby league)
 John Alan Robinson, British and American philosopher, mathematician, and early computer scientist

See also
 Allen Robinson